Lessons to Be Learned is the debut album by Australian singer-songwriter Gabriella Cilmi. It was released in the United Kingdom on 31 March 2008 by Island Records and in Australia on 10 May 2008 by Mushroom Records. Co-written and produced by the team Xenomania, the album takes its title from a line in the song "Sweet About Me", which became a worldwide hit.

Background 
Speaking in July 2008 to Pete Lewis of the magazine Blues & Soul, Cilmi explained the meaning behind the album title:

Several different versions of the album have been released with varying track lists, without there being one edition including all released tracks. On some early printings, "Messy" was not included. Tracks such as "Round and Round", "Sorry" and "Warm This Winter" were included as bonus tracks on only some editions of the album. A track titled "Sad Sad World" appeared only on a promotional UK version of the album.

Critical reception 

Lessons to Be Learned received generally mixed reviews from critics. Sharon Mawer from AllMusic called it "a good debut album" and praised Cilmi's "confidence" and range of styles, however did not feel the album was original, saying "it had all been heard before, many times in a crowded market". Mawer also compared her vocals and styles to artists including Anastacia, Joss Stone, Kylie Minogue, and Duffy. Daily Music Guide gave the album a generally mixed-to-negative review, calling "Sweet About Me" "slightly irritating" and also noted "if you expected ["Sweet About Me"] to give you a preview of what her debut album might sound like, you would be wrong". "Save the Lies" and "Sit in the Blues" were considered highlights of the album, while "Awkward Game" and "Einstein" were criticised for having "too much gloss".

Mike Joseph from PopMatters considered Cilmi an Amy Winehouse clone, yet without "a fraction of the wit or lived-in soulfulness that Back to Black (or even Winehouse's debut, Frank) possessed." Joseph also said he found himself "praying Lessons to Be Learned will end quickly". He highlighted "Safer" and "Sit in the Blues", but compared Cilmi negatively to fellow artists such as Winehouse, Adele and Duffy.

Track listing

Charts

Weekly charts

Year-end charts

Certifications

Release history

References

2008 debut albums
Gabriella Cilmi albums
Albums produced by Xenomania
ARIA Award-winning albums
Island Records albums